Steven Charles Emtman (born April 16, 1970) is a former professional American football defensive end who played in the National Football League (NFL). He played college football for the University of Washington and was selected first overall by the Indianapolis Colts in the 1992 NFL Draft. He also played for the Miami Dolphins and Washington Redskins before retiring following the 1997 season.

Early life
Emtman was born in Spokane, Washington, grew up in nearby Cheney, and graduated from Cheney High School in 1988. Lightly recruited, he accepted a football scholarship to the University of Washington in Seattle to play for head coach Don James.

College career
He redshirted in 1988, but soon became a star as a sophomore on a resurgent defense in 1990. Washington went 10-2 and won  the Rose Bowl for the first time in 9 seasons.  He was considered the best overall player on the 1991 Husky undefeated national championship team.  A consensus All-American, Emtman won the Outland Trophy, Lombardi Award, was the Bill Willis Award winner and the UPI Lineman of the Year. He was also named the Pac-10 Defensive Player of the Year during his impressive junior year of 1991. He finished fourth in the ballot for the Heisman Trophy.

Emtman finished 1991 with 62 tackles and 20.5 tackles for loss.

He was voted into the College Football Hall of Fame in 2006.

Professional career
Emtman decided to forgo his senior year and declared himself eligible for the 1992 NFL Draft. His most memorable play was the game-sealing 90-yard interception return for a touchdown as time expired in a 31–20 upset win at the Miami Dolphins in his rookie year, which earned him honors as AFC defensive player of the week.

Emtman's NFL career was marred by injuries. Playing a majority of his games on Astroturf, he finished each of his three seasons with the Colts on the injured reserve list. Nine games into his rookie year, he blew out his left knee against the Miami Dolphins. The following season, he tore the patellar tendon in his right knee, an injury that no previous NFL player had ever returned from. In October 1994, he beat the odds and made his comeback at home against the team he had grown up following, the Seattle Seahawks. On his first play, he tackled Chris Warren for a 5-yard loss. However, in the second quarter, he ruptured a disc in his neck in a collision with a teammate. Emtman continued to play, even though after the game, he could not close his fists due to nerve damage from the injury. He managed to play three more weeks until continuing pain forced him to undergo season-ending surgery. He later played for the Miami Dolphins and Washington Redskins.  His playing career ended following the 1997 season at the age of 27.

NFL career statistics

Personal life
Emtman had a cameo appearance as himself in the 1994 feature film Little Giants, along with Bruce Smith, Tim Brown, Emmitt Smith, and John Madden. He also appeared as an uncredited zombie in the TV series Z Nation. His son was the zombie baby from the first episode.

Emtman formerly volunteered as the defensive line coach for the af2's Spokane Shock.

Emtman now lives in Spokane Valley, Washington, where he is a real estate developer.

References

External links
1992 NFL Draft – 1st overall pick
Heisman.com – top defensive finishers

1970 births
Living people
People from Cheney, Washington
Players of American football from Spokane, Washington
American football defensive ends
American football defensive tackles
Washington Huskies football players
All-American college football players
College Football Hall of Fame inductees
National Football League first-overall draft picks
Indianapolis Colts players
Miami Dolphins players
Washington Redskins players
American real estate businesspeople
Ed Block Courage Award recipients